Reitzia is a genus of plants in the grass family.

The only known species is Reitzia smithii, native to southeastern Brazil (Santa Catarina, São Paulo, Rio de Janeiro).

References

Bambusoideae genera
Endemic flora of Brazil
Grasses of Brazil
Flora of the Atlantic Forest
Flora of Rio de Janeiro (state)
Flora of São Paulo (state)
Flora of Santa Catarina (state)
Monotypic Poaceae genera
Bambusoideae